Oreocryptophis porphyraceus is a rat snake species, commonly called the black-banded trinket snake, red bamboo snake, Thai bamboo rat snake or red mountain racer, found in mid to upper-level elevations of forested hills in southeastern Asia, ranging from evergreen tropical to dry seasonal forests depending on the subspecies and locality. It is the only member of the genus Oreocryptophis, but it was formerly placed in Elaphe.

Description
The head is small, sharp and squarish, while the color pattern includes red or orange colors, along with black bands or stripes. A terrestrial species, it has a preference for cool climates that restricts its habitat to hills and mountain plateaus. It is known to be crepuscular, active during the late evenings till night and dawn till late mornings. In captivity, it is one of the most sought-after rat snake species.

Distribution
India (Darjeeling, Sikkim, Assam, Arunachal Pradesh (Miao, Namdapha - Changlang district, Itanagar - Papum Pare district), Myanmar, Bhutan, Thailand, Laos, Cambodia, Vietnam, Nepal, South China (Tibet, Sichuan, Yunnan, Hong Kong, Hainan, northward to Henan and Gansu; south to Wei He river), Taiwan, West Malaysia (Cameron Highlands, Pahang), Indonesia (Sumatra). The type locality given is "India: Assam, Mishmi [Mishmee] Hills." It is also reported from Lowachhara National Park of North-eastern Bangladesh

Habitat
These rat snakes thrive under cool and very humid conditions. On many occasions they are found at altitudes exceeding 800 meters in evergreen moist rainforest or monsoon forests, depending on the subspecies and locality.  They spend most of the time hiding in leaf litter, under moss carpets, or under rocks and logs.

Diet
The diet consists primarily of rodents and other small mammals in the wild. Frogs are a possibility. In captivity, mice are accepted readily.

Subspecies

References

 Boulenger, George A. 1890 The Fauna of British India, Including Ceylon and Burma. Reptilia and Batrachia. Taylor & Francis, London, xviii, 541 pp.
 Cantor, T. E. 1839 Spicilegium serpentium indicorum [parts 1 and 2]. Proc. Zool. Soc. London, 7: 31-34, 49-55.
 Das, I. 1999 Biogeography of the amphibians and reptiles of the Andaman and Nicobar Islands, India. In: Ota, H. (ed) Tropical Island herpetofauna.., Elsevier, pp. 43–77
 Gray, J. E. 1853 Descriptions of some undescribed species of reptiles collected by Dr. Joseph Hooker in the Khassia Mountains, East Bengal, and Sikkim Himalaya. Ann. Mag. Nat. Hist. (2) 12: 386 - 392
 Grossmann, Wolfgang and Klaus Dieter Schulz. 2000 Elaphe porphyracea laticincta Schulz & Helfenberger. Sauria 22 (2):2
 Gumprecht, A. 2003 Anmerkungen zu den Chinesischen Kletternattern der Gattung Elaphe (sensu lato) Fitzinger 1833. Reptilia (Münster) 8 (6): 37-41
 Lenk, P.; Joger, U. & Wink, M. 2001 Phylogenetic relationships among European ratsnakes of the genus Elaphe Fitzinger based on mitochondrial DNA sequence comparisons. Amphibia-Reptilia 22 (3): 329-339
 Schulz, Klaus-Dieter 1996 A monograph of the colubrid snakes of the genus Elaphe Fitzinger. Koeltz Scientific Books, 439 pp.
 Schulz, Klaus-Dieter (Ed.) 2013 Old World Ratsnakes. A Collection of Papers. Bushmaster Publishing, 432 pp. 
 Utiger, Urs, Notker Helfenberger, Beat Schätti, Catherine Schmidt, Markus Ruf and Vincent Ziswiler 2002 Molecular systematics and phylogeny of Old World and New World ratsnakes, Elaphe Auct., and related genera (Reptilia, Squamata, Colubridae). Russ. J. Herpetol. 9 (2): 105-124.

External links

 Image of Oreocryptophis porphyraceus laticincta 
 Image of Oreocryptophis porphyraceus coxi 
 Image of Oreocryptophis porphyraceus coxi - hatching 
 

Colubrids
Monotypic snake genera
Snakes of Asia
Reptiles of Bhutan
Snakes of China
Reptiles of Cambodia
Reptiles of India
Reptiles of Indonesia
Reptiles of Laos
Reptiles of Malaysia
Reptiles of Myanmar
Reptiles of Nepal
Reptiles of Singapore
Reptiles of Taiwan
Reptiles of Thailand
Snakes of Vietnam
Reptiles described in 1839